Hohwald was a municipality in the Sächsische Schweiz district, in Saxony, Germany. It consisted of Berthelsdorf, Langburkersdorf, Niederottendorf, Oberottendorf, Rückersdorf and Rugiswalde.

History
The municipality was created on 1 January 1994 through the merger of three former municipalities Berthelsdorf, Langburkersdorf and Rückersdorf. The name was taken from the forest area Hohwald which is located north-east of the municipal territory. On 1 August 2007 it became part of Neustadt in Sachsen, after the residents decided on the 13 May 2007 to join the larger town.

References 

Former municipalities in Saxony
Neustadt in Sachsen